The 1986 Colonial Athletic Association men's basketball tournament was held February 28 – March 3, 2986 at the Patriot Center in Fairfax, Virginia. 

Navy defeated  in the championship game, 72–61, to win their second consecutive CAA/ECAC South men's basketball tournament. The Midshipmen, therefore, earned an automatic bid to the 1986 NCAA tournament. 

Second-seeded Richmond also qualified for the NCAA tournament, receiving an at-large bid.

Bracket

References

Colonial Athletic Association men's basketball tournament
Tournament
CAA men's basketball tournament
CAA men's basketball tournament
CAA men's basketball tournament
Sports competitions in Virginia
Basketball in Virginia